Carlingford Abbey, also called Carlingford Friary or Carlingford Priory, is a medieval Dominican abbey and National Monument located in Carlingford, County Louth, Ireland.

Location
Carlingford Abbey is located in the centre of the town, just off Dundalk Street.

History

This abbey was founded by the Dominican Order c. 1305 under the patronage of Richard Óg de Burgh, 2nd Earl of Ulster, and dedicated to Saint Malachy (1095–1148). Two towers were added to the northwest and southwest corners of the west gable in 1423, giving the church its fortified appearance. Rebuilding took place in the early 16th century. It remained in use until the Dissolution of the Monasteries. The buildings were then used for a hall, a barracks and a handball alley.

In 1671, under King Charles II, the abbey was to reopen, but ownership was disputed with the Franciscan. Oliver Plunkett, then Catholic Archbishop of Armagh, returned the Abbey to the Dominicans. The Abbey relocated to Dundalk in 1777.

Buildings

Remaining at Carlingford Abbey are the nave, chancel and central bell-tower, built of rough coursed limestone and greywacke. Slightly to the south are outbuildings and a mill house.

Defensive towers, crenellations and a machicolation were added in the 15th century.

See also
List of abbeys and priories in Ireland (County Louth)

References

Christian monasteries in the Republic of Ireland
Religion in County Louth
Archaeological sites in County Louth
National Monuments in County Louth
Dominican monasteries in the Republic of Ireland
1305 establishments in Europe
Carlingford, County Louth